Casita del Príncipe may refer to either of two houses in the Madrid region:

 Casita del Príncipe (El Escorial)
 Casita del Príncipe (El Pardo)